Still Run is the second studio album by American band Wet. It was released on July 13, 2018 by Columbia Records. It was announced on May 11, 2018, with the release of the third single off the album, "Lately". The first single off the album, "There's a Reason" was released on March 9, 2018. The same day, a US tour with Inc. No World was announced. The album was supported by four singles, "There's a Reason", "Softens", "Lately", and "You're Not Wrong". It is the band's first album without founding member Marty Sulkow, who left the band one year earlier due to "tensions mounted over artistic direction".

Track listing

Personnel 
Credits adapted from Tidal and Instagram.
 Kelly Zutrau – vocals, producer, synthesizer, strings
 Joseph Valle – producer, engineer, acoustic guitar, electric guitar, programmer, strings, synthesizer, piano, bass, horn, organ
 Bryndon Cook (as Starchild & The New Romantic) – background vocals (track 1)
 Garo Yellin – cello (track 1)
 TJ Maiani – drums (track 1)
 Sam Geller – piano (track 1)
 Jesse Kotansky – strings, violin (track 1)
 Meg Duffy – acoustic guitar, electric guitar (track 2)	
 Hamilton Berry – cello (tracks 2, 5, 9, 10), strings (track 9)	
 Joey Waronker – drums (tracks 2, 8)
 Shane O'Connell – electric guitar (track 2), engineer (track 4, 5)
 Buddy Ross – piano, synthesizer (track 2, 8)	
 Daniel Aged – steel guitar (tracks 2, 6, 8), bass (tracks 2, 6, 8, 9)
 Joe Santa Maria – saxophone (track 3)
 Chris Smith – keyboard, piano (tracks 4, 6), background vocals, guitar (track 6)
 Danny Meyer – Saxophone (track 4)
 Gabriel Smith – piano (track 4), drums (tracks 5, 9)
 Melody English – background vocals (track 5)
 Aerial East – background vocals (track 5, 6)
 Sam Geller – background vocals (track 5)
 Sean Tracy – acoustic guitar, electric guitar (tracks 5, 10), slide guitar (track 10)
 Amanda Lo – violin (track 5)
 Michael McTaggart – guitar (track 6)
 Lykke Li – background vocals (track 7)
 Oliver Hill – strings, viola, violin (track 8)
 James Richardson – slide guitar (track 9)
 Loren Humphrey – producer, engineer (tracks 1, 2, 4, 5 (engineer only)), drums (track 4)
 Andrew Sarlo – producer, engineer (tracks 2, 5, 8, 10)
 Rostam Batmanglij – producer, engineer, bass, electric guitar, piano, synthesizer (tracks 3, 7), mandolin, acoustic guitar, slide guitar (track 7)	
 Robert Ackroyd – producer (track 4), electric guitar (track 8)
 John Hill – producer, electric guitar, programmer, synthesizer (track 4)
 Noah Beresin – producer (tracks 6, 9), piano (track 9)
 Logan Patrick – engineer (track 3)
 Nick Rowe – engineer (tracks 3, 7), mandolin (track 7)
 Rob Cohen – engineer (track 4)
 Quinn McCarthy – engineer (tracks 5, 6, 9)
 Rob Duffy – engineer (tracks 6, 8, 9)
 John Thayer – engineer (tracks 6, 9)
 David Schwerkolt – engineer (track 9)
 Tom Elmhirst – mixing
 Ted Jensen – mastering	
 Brandon Bost – assistant engineer
 Bráulio Amado - design
 Brianna Capozzi - cover
 Amber Byrne Mahoney - insert photography

Release history

Charts

References 

2018 albums
Wet (band) albums
Columbia Records albums